Luca Nicolae Banu (born 31 January 2005) is a Romanian professional footballer who plays as a dentral midfielder for Liga I side Farul Constanța.

Club career

Farul Constanta
He made his league debut on 2 October 2022 in Liga I match against UTA Arad.

Career statistics

Club

References

External links
 
 

2005 births
Living people
Sportspeople from Constanța
Romanian footballers
Romania youth international footballers
Association football midfielders
Liga I players
FCV Farul Constanța players